Krasimira Gyurova (Bulgarian: Красимира Гюрова) (26 October 1953 – 30 March 2011) was a Bulgarian basketball player who competed in the 1976 Summer Olympics.

References

1953 births
2011 deaths
Bulgarian women's basketball players
Olympic basketball players of Bulgaria
Basketball players at the 1976 Summer Olympics
Olympic bronze medalists for Bulgaria
Olympic medalists in basketball
Medalists at the 1976 Summer Olympics